CJ Clarke is a British independent filmmaker, photojournalist and photographer based in London, England. He is the author of Magic Party Place, a book documenting contemporary England and mapping the roots of Brexit in the process. Clarke's works have been commended at Ian Parry Award, three Magenta Flash Forward Awards and two Observer Hodge Photographic Awards. He is also the co-founder and director of Just Another Photo Festival, an Indian photography festival that democratises access to visual media.

Biography
Clarke was born and raised in Basildon, England. He went to the University of York where he studied English Literature. In 2005, he moved to London where he studied documentary photography at the London College of Communication. Clarke began his professional career in 2005 while exploring and documenting his hometown Basildon in Essex for his photobook, Magic Party Place. In 2010, he produced and directed a short film, Mother & Daughter: Cody’s Story. The film won the inaugural edition of the British Journal of Photography's Open Shutter Award. Mother & Daughter: Cody’s Story was produced for the British charity School-Home Support.

In 2015, Clarke co-founded Just Another Photo Festival (JAPF) in India, with Poulomi Basu, a documentary photographer. JAPF is a guerrilla festival that aims at providing the art of photography to mass audiences irrespective of their background. He is also the co-founder of the crowdsourced activist initiative The Rape In India Project. In 2016, Clarke authored Magic Party Place, a decade-long project documenting ordinary town of Basildon and the rise of the rights that led to Brexit. The book received critical reviews from several news outlets including The Guardian, Time and Dazed. Magic Party Place was shortlisted for multiple awards including the Aperture Paris Photo First Book Award 2016, Arles Authors Book Award 2017, Photo Espana Book of the Year 2017 and Photo London Krasna-Kraus Photo Book Award 2017.

In 2018, Clarke produced Blood Speaks, a transmedia project created by Poulomi Basu. Blood Speaks investigates normalised physical violence against women. The project was premiered at the Margaret Mead Film Festival and selected for Sheffield DocFest in 2018. In March 2019, Clarke and Poulomi Basu presented the project at the South by Southwest in Austin, Texas. In March 2022, Clarke collaborated again with Poulomi Basu for the transmedia project, Fireflies, a series portraying relationship between mother and daughter. Currently, Clarke is working on the project Loyalists about post-peace in contemporary Northern Ireland.

Books
 Magic Party Place, (2016) published by Kehrer Verlag and designed by Teun van der Heijden.
 A Matter of Perspective in Digital Investigative Journalism, (2018) ed. Oliver Hahn and Florian Stalph published by Palgrave MacMillan.

References

External links
Official website

British filmmakers
21st-century British photographers
British photojournalists
People from Basildon
Alumni of the University of York
Year of birth missing (living people)
Living people